Dimorphotricha is a genus of fungi within the Hyaloscyphaceae family. This is a monotypic genus, containing the single species Dimorphotricha australis.

References

External links
Dimorphotricha at Index Fungorum

Hyaloscyphaceae
Monotypic Leotiomycetes genera